Regina Birdsell (born Mar 4, 1956) is an American politician who has served in the New Hampshire Senate from the 19th district since 2014. She previously served in the New Hampshire House of Representatives from 2010 to 2014.

She lives in Hampstead, New Hampshire and earned a bachelor's degree in management from Merrimack College

References

Living people
Republican Party members of the New Hampshire House of Representatives
Republican Party New Hampshire state senators
21st-century American women politicians
Women state legislators in New Hampshire
1956 births